A theory is a rational type of abstract thinking about a phenomenon, or the results of such thinking. The process of contemplative and rational thinking is often associated with such processes as observational study or research. Theories may be scientific, belong to a non-scientific discipline, or no discipline at all. Depending on the context, a theory's assertions might, for example, include generalized explanations of how nature works. The word has its roots in ancient Greek, but in modern use it has taken on several related meanings.

In modern science, the term "theory" refers to scientific theories, a well-confirmed type of explanation of nature, made in a way consistent with the scientific method, and fulfilling the criteria required by modern science. Such theories are described in such a way that scientific tests should be able to provide empirical support for it, or empirical contradiction ("falsify") of it. Scientific theories are the most reliable, rigorous, and comprehensive form of scientific knowledge, in contrast to more common uses of the word "theory" that imply that something is unproven or speculative (which in formal terms is better characterized by the word hypothesis). Scientific theories are distinguished from hypotheses, which are individual empirically testable conjectures, and from scientific laws, which are descriptive accounts of the way nature behaves under certain conditions.

Theories guide the enterprise of finding facts rather than of reaching goals, and are neutral concerning alternatives among values. A theory can be a body of knowledge, which may or may not be associated with particular explanatory models. To theorize is to develop this body of knowledge.

The word theory or "in theory" is sometimes used erroneously by people to explain something which they individually did not experience or test before. In those instances, semantically, it is being substituted for another concept, a hypothesis. Instead of using the word "hypothetically", it is replaced by a phrase: "in theory". In some instances the theory's credibility could be contested by calling it "just a theory" (implying that the idea has not even been tested). Hence, that word "theory" is very often contrasted to "practice" (from Greek praxis, πρᾶξις) a Greek term for doing, which is opposed to theory. A "classical example" of the distinction between "theoretical" and "practical" uses the discipline of medicine: medical theory involves trying to understand the causes and nature of health and sickness, while the practical side of medicine is trying to make people healthy. These two things are related but can be independent, because it is possible to research health and sickness without curing specific patients, and it is possible to cure a patient without knowing how the cure worked.

Ancient usage 
The English word theory derives from a technical term in philosophy in Ancient Greek. As an everyday word, theoria, meant "looking at, viewing, beholding", but in more technical contexts it came to refer to contemplative or speculative understandings of natural things, such as those of natural philosophers, as opposed to more practical ways of knowing things, like that of skilled orators or artisans. English-speakers have used the word theory since at least the late 16th century. Modern uses of the word theory derive from the original definition, but have taken on new shades of meaning, still based on the idea of a theory as a thoughtful and rational explanation of the general nature of things.

Although it has more mundane meanings in Greek, the word  apparently developed special uses early in the recorded history of the Greek language. In the book From Religion to Philosophy, Francis Cornford suggests that the Orphics used the word theoria to mean "passionate sympathetic contemplation". Pythagoras changed the word to mean "the passionless contemplation of rational, unchanging truth" of mathematical knowledge, because he considered this intellectual pursuit the way to reach the highest plane of existence. Pythagoras emphasized subduing emotions and bodily desires to help the intellect function at the higher plane of theory. Thus, it was Pythagoras who gave the word theory the specific meaning that led to the classical and modern concept of a distinction between theory (as uninvolved, neutral thinking) and practice.

Aristotle's terminology, as already mentioned, contrasts theory with praxis or practice, and this contrast exists till today. For Aristotle, both practice and theory involve thinking, but the aims are different. Theoretical contemplation considers things humans do not move or change, such as nature, so it has no human aim apart from itself and the knowledge it helps create. On the other hand, praxis involves thinking, but always with an aim to desired actions, whereby humans cause change or movement themselves for their own ends. Any human movement that involves no conscious choice and thinking could not be an example of praxis or doing.

Formality

Theories are analytical tools for understanding, explaining, and making predictions about a given subject matter. There are theories in many and varied fields of study, including the arts and sciences. A formal theory is syntactic in nature and is only meaningful when given a semantic component by applying it to some content (e.g., facts and relationships of the actual historical world as it is unfolding). Theories in various fields of study are expressed in natural language, but are always constructed in such a way that their general form is identical to a theory as it is expressed in the formal language of mathematical logic. Theories may be expressed mathematically, symbolically, or in common language, but are generally expected to follow principles of rational thought or logic.

Theory is constructed of a set of sentences that are entirely true statements about the subject under consideration. However, the truth of any one of these statements is always relative to the whole theory. Therefore, the same statement may be true with respect to one theory, and not true with respect to another. This is, in ordinary language, where statements such as "He is a terrible person" cannot be judged as true or false without reference to some interpretation of who "He" is and for that matter what a "terrible person" is under the theory.

Sometimes two theories have exactly the same explanatory power because they make the same predictions. A pair of such theories is called indistinguishable or observationally equivalent, and the choice between them reduces to convenience or philosophical preference.

The form of theories is studied formally in mathematical logic, especially in model theory. When theories are studied in mathematics, they are usually expressed in some formal language and their statements are closed under application of certain procedures called rules of inference. A special case of this, an axiomatic theory, consists of axioms (or axiom schemata) and rules of inference. A theorem is a statement that can be derived from those axioms by application of these rules of inference. Theories used in applications are abstractions of observed phenomena and the resulting theorems provide solutions to real-world problems. Obvious examples include arithmetic (abstracting concepts of number), geometry (concepts of space), and probability (concepts of randomness and likelihood).

Gödel's incompleteness theorem shows that no consistent, recursively enumerable theory (that is, one whose theorems form a recursively enumerable set) in which the concept of natural numbers can be expressed, can include all true statements about them. As a result, some domains of knowledge cannot be formalized, accurately and completely, as mathematical theories. (Here, formalizing accurately and completely means that all true propositions—and only true propositions—are derivable within the mathematical system.) This limitation, however, in no way precludes the construction of mathematical theories that formalize large bodies of scientific knowledge.

Underdetermination

A theory is underdetermined (also called indeterminacy of data to theory) if a rival, inconsistent theory is at least as consistent with the evidence. Underdetermination is an epistemological issue about the relation of evidence to conclusions.

A theory that lacks supporting evidence is generally, more properly, referred to as a hypothesis.

Intertheoretic reduction and elimination

If a new theory better explains and predicts a phenomenon than an old theory (i.e., it has more explanatory power), we are justified in believing that the newer theory describes reality more correctly. This is called an intertheoretic reduction because the terms of the old theory can be reduced to the terms of the new one. For instance, our historical understanding about sound, "light" and heat have been reduced to wave compressions and rarefactions, electromagnetic waves, and molecular kinetic energy, respectively. These terms, which are identified with each other, are called intertheoretic identities. When an old and new theory are parallel in this way, we can conclude that the new one describes the same reality, only more completely.

When a new theory uses new terms that do not reduce to terms of an older theory, but rather replace them because they misrepresent reality, it is called an intertheoretic elimination. For instance, the obsolete scientific theory that put forward an understanding of heat transfer in terms of the movement of caloric fluid was eliminated when a theory of heat as energy replaced it. Also, the theory that phlogiston is a substance released from burning and rusting material was eliminated with the new understanding of the reactivity of oxygen.

Versus theorems
Theories are distinct from theorems. A theorem is derived deductively from axioms (basic assumptions) according to a formal system of rules, sometimes as an end in itself and sometimes as a first step toward being tested or applied in a concrete situation; theorems are said to be true in the sense that the conclusions of a theorem are logical consequences of the axioms. Theories are abstract and conceptual, and are supported or challenged by observations in the world. They are 'rigorously tentative', meaning that they are proposed as true and expected to satisfy careful examination to account for the possibility of faulty inference or incorrect observation. Sometimes theories are incorrect, meaning that an explicit set of observations contradicts some fundamental objection or application of the theory, but more often theories are corrected to conform to new observations, by restricting the class of phenomena the theory applies to or changing the assertions made. An example of the former is the restriction of classical mechanics to phenomena involving macroscopic length scales and particle speeds much lower than the speed of light.

The theory–practice gap 
Theory is often distinguished from practice. The question of whether theoretical models of work are relevant to work itself is of interest to scholars of professions such as medicine, engineering, and law, and management.

This gap between theory and practice has been framed as a knowledge transfer where there is a task of translating research knowledge to be application in practice, and ensuring that practitioners are made aware of it academics have been criticized for not attempting to transfer the knowledge they produce to practitioners. Another framing supposes that theory and knowledge seek to understand different problems and model the world in different words (using different ontologies and epistemologies) . Another framing says that research does not produce theory that is relevant to practice.

In the context of management, Van de Van and Johnson propose a form of engaged scholarship where scholars examine problems that occur in practice, in an interdisciplinary fashion, producing results that create both new practical results as well as new theoretical models, but targeting theoretical results shared in an academic fashion. They use a metaphor of "arbitrage" of ideas between disciplines, distinguishing it from collaboration.

Scientific

In science, the term "theory" refers to "a well-substantiated explanation of some aspect of the natural world, based on a body of facts that have been repeatedly confirmed through observation and experiment." Theories must also meet further requirements, such as the ability to make falsifiable predictions with consistent accuracy across a broad area of scientific inquiry, and production of strong evidence in favor of the theory from multiple independent sources (consilience).

The strength of a scientific theory is related to the diversity of phenomena it can explain, which is measured by its ability to make falsifiable predictions with respect to those phenomena. Theories are improved (or replaced by better theories) as more evidence is gathered, so that accuracy in prediction improves over time; this increased accuracy corresponds to an increase in scientific knowledge. Scientists use theories as a foundation to gain further scientific knowledge, as well as to accomplish goals such as inventing technology or curing diseases.

Definitions from scientific organizations
The United States National Academy of Sciences defines scientific theories as follows:The formal scientific definition of "theory" is quite different from the everyday meaning of the word. It refers to a comprehensive explanation of some aspect of nature that is supported by a vast body of evidence. Many scientific theories are so well established that no new evidence is likely to alter them substantially. For example, no new evidence will demonstrate that the Earth does not orbit around the sun (heliocentric theory), or that living things are not made of cells (cell theory), that matter is not composed of atoms, or that the surface of the Earth is not divided into solid plates that have moved over geological timescales (the theory of plate tectonics) ... One of the most useful properties of scientific theories is that they can be used to make predictions about natural events or phenomena that have not yet been observed.

From the American Association for the Advancement of Science:
A scientific theory is a well-substantiated explanation of some aspect of the natural world, based on a body of facts that have been repeatedly confirmed through observation and experiment. Such fact-supported theories are not "guesses" but reliable accounts of the real world. The theory of biological evolution is more than "just a theory." It is as factual an explanation of the universe as the atomic theory of matter or the germ theory of disease. Our understanding of gravity is still a work in progress. But the phenomenon of gravity, like evolution, is an accepted fact.

The term theory is not appropriate for describing scientific models or untested, but intricate hypotheses.

Philosophical views
The logical positivists thought of scientific theories as deductive theories—that a theory's content is based on some formal system of logic and on basic axioms. In a deductive theory, any sentence which is a logical consequence of one or more of the axioms is also a sentence of that theory. This is called the received view of theories.

In the semantic view of theories, which has largely replaced the received view, theories are viewed as scientific models. A model is a logical framework intended to represent reality (a "model of reality"), similar to the way that a map is a graphical model that represents the territory of a city or country. In this approach, theories are a specific category of models that fulfill the necessary criteria. (See Theories as models for further discussion.)

In physics
In physics the term theory is generally used for a mathematical framework—derived from a small set of basic postulates (usually symmetries, like equality of locations in space or in time, or identity of electrons, etc.)—which is capable of producing experimental predictions for a given category of physical systems. One good example is classical electromagnetism, which encompasses results derived from gauge symmetry (sometimes called gauge invariance) in a form of a few equations called Maxwell's equations. The specific mathematical aspects of classical electromagnetic theory are termed "laws of electromagnetism", reflecting the level of consistent and reproducible evidence that supports them. Within electromagnetic theory generally, there are numerous hypotheses about how electromagnetism applies to specific situations. Many of these hypotheses are already considered adequately tested, with new ones always in the making and perhaps untested.

Regarding the term "theoretical" 
Certain tests may be infeasible or technically difficult. As a result, theories may make predictions that have not been confirmed or proven incorrect. These predictions may be described informally as "theoretical". They can be tested later, and if they are incorrect, this may lead to revision, invalidation, or rejection of the theory.

Mathematical 

In mathematics the use of the term theory is different, necessarily so, since mathematics contains no explanations of natural phenomena, per se, even though it may help provide insight into natural systems or be inspired by them. In the general sense, a mathematical theory is a branch of or topic in mathematics, such as Set theory, Number theory, Group theory, Probability theory, Game theory, Control theory, Perturbation theory, etc., such as might be appropriate for a single textbook.

In the same sense, but more specifically, the word theory is an extensive, structured collection of theorems, organized so that the proof of each theorem only requires the theorems and axioms that preceded it (no circular proofs), occurs as early as feasible in sequence (no postponed proofs), and the whole is as succinct as possible (no redundant proofs). Ideally, the sequence in which the theorems are presented is as easy to understand as possible, although illuminating a branch of mathematics is the purpose of textbooks, rather than the mathematical theory they might be written to cover.

Philosophical

A theory can be either descriptive as in science, or prescriptive (normative) as in philosophy. The latter are those whose subject matter consists not of empirical data, but rather of ideas. At least some of the elementary theorems of a philosophical theory are statements whose truth cannot necessarily be scientifically tested through empirical observation.

A field of study is sometimes named a "theory" because its basis is some initial set of assumptions describing the field's approach to the subject. These assumptions are the elementary theorems of the particular theory, and can be thought of as the axioms of that field. Some commonly known examples include set theory and number theory; however literary theory, critical theory, and music theory are also of the same form.

Metatheory 

One form of philosophical theory is a metatheory or meta-theory. A metatheory is a theory whose subject matter is some other theory or set of theories. In other words, it is a theory about theories. Statements made in the metatheory about the theory are called metatheorems.

Political

A political theory is an ethical theory about the law and government. Often the term "political theory" refers to a general view, or specific ethic, political belief or attitude, thought about politics.

Jurisprudential 

In social science, jurisprudence is the philosophical theory of law. Contemporary philosophy of law addresses problems internal to law and legal systems, and problems of law as a particular social institution.

Examples
Most of the following are scientific theories. Some are not, but rather encompass a body of knowledge or art, such as Music theory and Visual Arts Theories.

 Anthropology: Carneiro's circumscription theory
 Astronomy: Alpher–Bethe–Gamow theory — B2FH Theory — Copernican theory — Newton's theory of gravitation — Hubble's law — Kepler's laws of planetary motion Ptolemaic theory
 Biology: Cell theory — Chemiosmotic theory — Evolution — Germ theory — Symbiogenesis
 Chemistry: Molecular theory — Kinetic theory of gases — Molecular orbital theory — Valence bond theory — Transition state theory — RRKM theory — Chemical graph theory — Flory–Huggins solution theory — Marcus theory — Lewis theory (successor to Brønsted–Lowry acid–base theory) — HSAB theory — Debye–Hückel theory — Thermodynamic theory of polymer elasticity — Reptation theory — Polymer field theory — Møller–Plesset perturbation theory — density functional theory — Frontier molecular orbital theory — Polyhedral skeletal electron pair theory — Baeyer strain theory — Quantum theory of atoms in molecules — Collision theory — Ligand field theory (successor to Crystal field theory) — Variational transition-state theory — Benson group increment theory — Specific ion interaction theory
 Climatology: Climate change theory (general study of climate changes) and anthropogenic climate change (ACC)/ global warming (AGW) theories (due to human activity)
 Computer Science: Automata theory — Queueing theory
 Cosmology: Big Bang Theory — Cosmic inflation — Loop quantum gravity — Superstring theory — Supergravity — Supersymmetric theory — Multiverse theory — Holographic principle — Quantum gravity — M-theory
 Economics: Macroeconomic theory — Microeconomic theory — Law of Supply and demand
 Education: Constructivist theory — Critical pedagogy theory — Education theory — Multiple intelligence theory — Progressive education theory
 Engineering: Circuit theory — Control theory — Signal theory — Systems theory — Information theory
 Film: Film theory
 Geology: Plate tectonics
 Humanities: Critical theory
 Jurisprudence or 'Legal theory': Natural law — Legal positivism — Legal realism — Critical legal studies
 Law: see Jurisprudence; also Case theory
 Linguistics: X-bar theory — Government and Binding — Principles and parameters — Universal grammar
 Literature: Literary theory
 Mathematics: Approximation theory — Arakelov theory — Asymptotic theory — Bifurcation theory — Catastrophe theory — Category theory — Chaos theory — Choquet theory — Coding theory — Combinatorial game theory — Computability theory — Computational complexity theory — Deformation theory — Dimension theory — Ergodic theory — Field theory — Galois theory — Game theory — Gauge theory — Graph theory — Group theory — Hodge theory — Homology theory — Homotopy theory — Ideal theory — Intersection theory — Invariant theory — Iwasawa theory — K-theory — KK-theory — Knot theory — L-theory — Lie theory — Littlewood–Paley theory — Matrix theory — Measure theory — Model theory — Module theory — Morse theory — Nevanlinna theory — Number theory — Obstruction theory — Operator theory — Order theory — PCF theory — Perturbation theory — Potential theory — Probability theory — Ramsey theory — Rational choice theory — Representation theory — Ring theory — Set theory — Shape theory — Small cancellation theory — Spectral theory — Stability theory — Stable theory — Sturm–Liouville theory — Surgery theory — Twistor theory — Yang–Mills theory
 Music: Music theory
 Philosophy: Proof theory — Speculative reason — Theory of truth — Type theory — Value theory — Virtue theory
 Physics: Acoustic theory — Antenna theory — Atomic theory — BCS theory — Conformal field theory — Dirac hole theory — Dynamo theory — Landau theory — M-theory — Perturbation theory — Theory of relativity (successor to classical mechanics) — Gauge theory — Quantum field theory — Scattering theory — String theory — Quantum information theory
 Psychology: Theory of mind — Cognitive dissonance theory — Attachment theory — Object permanence — Poverty of stimulus — Attribution theory — Self-fulfilling prophecy — Stockholm syndrome
 Public Budgeting: Incrementalism — Zero-based budgeting
 Public Administration: Organizational theory
 Semiotics: Intertheoricity – Transferogenesis
 Sociology: Critical theory — Engaged theory — Social theory — Sociological theory – Social capital theory
 Statistics: Extreme value theory
 Theatre: Performance theory
 Visual Arts: Aesthetics — Art educational theory — Architecture — Composition — Anatomy — Color theory — Perspective — Visual perception — Geometry — Manifolds
 Other: Obsolete scientific theories

See also 

 Falsifiability
 Hypothesis testing
 Physical law
 Predictive power
 Testability
 Theoretical definition

Notes

References

Citations

Sources 

 Davidson Reynolds, Paul (1971). A primer in theory construction. Boston: Allyn and Bacon.
 Guillaume, Astrid (2015). « Intertheoricity: Plasticity, Elasticity and Hybridity of Theories. Part II: Semiotics of Transferogenesis », in Human and Social studies, Vol.4, N°2 (2015), éd.Walter de Gruyter, Boston, Berlin, pp. 59–77.
 Guillaume, Astrid (2015). « The Intertheoricity : Plasticity, Elasticity and Hybridity of Theories », in Human and Social studies, Vol.4, N°1 (2015), éd.Walter de Gruyter, Boston, Berlin, pp. 13–29.
 Hawking, Stephen (1996). A Brief History of Time (Updated and expanded ed.). New York: Bantam Books, p. 15.
 
 .
 Popper, Karl (1963), Conjectures and Refutations, Routledge and Kegan Paul, London, UK, pp. 33–39.  Reprinted in Theodore Schick (ed., 2000), Readings in the Philosophy of Science, Mayfield Publishing Company, Mountain View, California, USA, pp. 9–13.
 Zima, Peter V. (2007). "What is theory? Cultural theory as discourse and dialogue". London: Continuum (translated from: Was ist Theorie? Theoriebegriff und Dialogische Theorie in der Kultur- und Sozialwissenschaften. Tübingen: A. Franke Verlag, 2004).

External links 

 "How science works: Even theories change", Understanding Science by the University of California Museum of Paleontology.
  What is a Theory?

 
Abstraction
Conceptual systems
Inductive reasoning
Ontology